Polik-mana or Butterfly Maiden is a kachina, or spirit being, in Hopi mythology. Every spring she dances from flower to flower, pollinating the fields and flowers and bringing life-giving rain to the Arizona desert. She is represented by a woman dancer at the yearly Butterfly Dance, a traditional initiation rite for Hopi girls. The rite takes place in late summer, before the harvest, to give thanks to Polik-mana for her spring dance. Hopi girls participating in the Butterfly Dance wear ornate headdresses called kopatsoki.

The Polik-mana Mons, a mountain on Venus, is named for the Butterfly Maiden.

References

External links 

 Hopi Butterfly Dance 9/6/09 Kykotsmovi, Az (video)

Hopi mythology